In the context of magazines, Marketing may refer to:

 Marketing (British magazine), established 1931, defunct 2016
 Marketing (Canadian magazine), which merged into Strategy in 2016
 Marketing (Indonesian magazine), established 2001

See also 
 Marketing